The 1968–69 St. Francis Terriers men's basketball team represented St. Francis College during the 1968–69 NCAA University Division men's basketball season. The team was coached by Daniel Lynch, who was in his twenty-first year at the helm of the St. Francis Terriers. The Terriers played their homes games at the 69th Regiment Armory and  played as an Independent, not affiliated with a conference.

The Terriers finished the season at 7–16 overall. After the season, Daniel Lynch retired as the men's basketball head coach and continued to be the St. Francis College Athletics Director.

Roster

    

source

Schedule and results

|-
!colspan=12 style="background:#0038A8; border: 2px solid #CE1126;;color:#FFFFFF;"| Regular Season

Awards

At the end of the season John Conforti was selected to the All-Metropolitan Team by the Metropolitan Basketball Writers Association.

References

St. Francis Brooklyn Terriers men's basketball seasons
St. Francis
Saint Francis
Saint Francis